Start. Stop. is a studio album by Swedish rock band , released in 1997.

Track listing

 "Hopey " – 2:35
 "Ladybugs " – 4:20
 "Untied " – 3:01
 "Before You Croke" – 3:03
 "For How Long Can You Hold Your Breath" – 4:39
 "Neutrino" – 3:17
 "Whatever Gets You By" – 4:32
 "Untitled" – 2:59
 "Painted Face" – 2:46
 "Dig Here" – 4:33
 "Ventilate" – 2:23
 "Dominator" – 3:35

1997 albums
Him Kerosene albums